L'Absinthe (English: The Absinthe Drinker or Glass of Absinthe) is a painting by Edgar Degas, painted between 1875 and 1876. Its original title was Dans un Café, a name often used today.

Other early titles were A sketch of a French Café and Figures at Café. Then, when exhibited in London in 1893, the title was changed to L'Absinthe, the name by which the painting is now commonly known. It is in the permanent collection of the Musée d'Orsay in Paris.

Description
Painted in 1875–76, the work portrays a woman and man sitting side-by-side, drinking a glass of absinthe. They appear lethargic and lonely. The man, wearing a hat, looks to the right off the edge of the canvas, while the woman, dressed more formally in fashionable dress and hat, stares vacantly downward. A glass filled with absinthe is on the table in front of her. The models used in the painting are Ellen Andrée, an actress who also appeared in Édouard Manet's paintings Chez le père Lathuille and Plum Brandy, and Marcellin Desboutin, a painter and etcher. The café where they are taking their refreshment is the Café de la Nouvelle-Athènes in Paris.

Reception
At its first showing in 1876, the picture was panned by critics, who called it ugly and disgusting. It was put into storage until being exhibited again in 1892, but was again treated with derision. The painting was shown again at the Grafton Gallery in England in 1893, this time entitled L'Absinthe, where it sparked even greater controversy. The people and the absinthe represented in the painting were considered by English critics to be shockingly degraded and uncouth. Many regarded the painting as a blow to morality; this was the general view of such Victorians as Sir William Blake Richmond and Walter Crane when shown the painting in London. That reaction was typical of the age, revealing the deep suspicion with which Victorian England had regarded art in France since the early days of the Barbizon School, and the desire to find a morally uplifting lesson in works of art. Many English critics viewed the picture as a warning lesson against absinthe, and the French in general. The comment by George Moore on the woman depicted was: "What a whore!" He added, "the tale is not a pleasant one, but it is a lesson". However, in his book Modern Painting, Moore regretted assigning a moral lesson to the work, claiming that "the picture is merely a work of art, and has nothing to do with drink or sociology."

See also
 Cultural references to absinthe
 Automat, similar subject
 The Plum, similar subject

References

Further reading

External links
 Green Fairy: The symbol of liberté — Examines L'Absinthe as a fitting example of the "nervous fear that the decadent ways of the Continent might reach the shores of the British Isles".
 Musée d'Orsay discussion of the painting 
 Degas: The Artist's Mind, exhibition catalog from The Metropolitan Museum of Art fully available online as PDF, which contains material on L'Absinthe (see index)

1876 paintings
Absinthe
Paintings in the collection of the Musée d'Orsay
Paintings by Edgar Degas
Food and drink paintings